Pseudochromis dilectus is a species of ray-finned fish from the Western Indian Ocean which is classified in the family Pseudochromidae, the dottybacks. It occasionally makes its way into the aquarium trade.

References

dilectus
Taxa named by Roger Lubbock
Fish described in 1976